Qualification for the 2014 Little League World Series took place in eight United States regions and eight international regions from June through August 10, 2014.

United States

Great Lakes
The tournament took place in Indianapolis, Indiana from August 2–9.

 

*On February 15, 2015, Jackie Robinson West Little League was forced to forfeit all its matches due to rules violations for fielding ineligible players - they are officially recorded as 6-0 victories for the opposing team.  The Great Lakes Championship was retroactively awarded to the Indiana representative New Albany Little League.

Mid-Atlantic
The tournament took place in Bristol, Connecticut from August 1–10.

Midwest
The tournament took place in Indianapolis, Indiana from August 1–8.

Note: North Dakota and South Dakota are organized into a single Little League district.

New England
The tournament took place in Bristol, Connecticut from August 1–9.

Northwest
The tournament took place in San Bernardino, California from August 1–9.

Southeast
The tournament took place in Warner Robins, Georgia from August 2–8.

 Peachtree City National Little League of Peachtree City, Georgia won the Georgia state tournament by defeating Columbus Northern. However, Peachtree City was stripped of their title by virtue of having twelve players on the team whose league age was 12-years old. Little League regulations state that the maximum number for a team is eight.

Southwest
The tournament took place in Waco, Texas from August 1–6.

West
The tournament took place in San Bernardino, California from August 1–9.

International

Asia-Pacific and Middle East
The tournament took place in Clark, Philippines from June 29–July 5.

1 Republic of China, commonly known as Taiwan, due to complicated relations with People's Republic of China, is recognized by the name Chinese Taipei by majority of international organizations including Little League Baseball (LLB). For more information, please see Cross-Strait relations.

Australia
The tournament took place in Gold Coast, Queensland on June 4–9. The top two teams in each pool advance to the elimination round, where they are seeded one through eight based on overall record. The "runs against ratio" (RAR) is used as the tiebreaker. It is calculated by the number of runs scored against a team, divided by the number of defensive innings the team played.

Canada
The tournament took place in Salaberry-de-Valleyfield, Quebec from August 1–10.

Caribbean
The tournament took place in Freeport, Bahamas from July 19–25.

Europe & Africa

The tournament took place in Kutno, Poland on July 14–21.

Japan
The first two rounds of the tournament were held on June 28, and the remaining two rounds were played on July 5. All games are played in Tokyo.

Latin America
The tournament took place in Managua, Nicaragua from June 22–29.

Mexico
The tournament took place in Monterrey, Nuevo León during July 5–11.

References

qualification
2014 in baseball